Herbert Roesky (born 6 November 1935) is an internationally renowned German inorganic chemist.

Biography
Professor Herbert W. Roesky was born in 1935 in Laukischken. He obtained his doctorate from Göttingen and worked at Du Pont in the United States before returning to his alma mater where he retired in 2004. He is primarily known for his pioneering work on fluorides of both transitional and normal metals. He has been a Visiting Professor at Jawaharlal Nehru Centre for Advanced Scientific Research, Bangalore, Tokyo Institute of Technology, and Kyoto University, and he has also been a Frontier Lecturer at Texas A&M University at College Station, University of Texas at Austin, and University of Iowa at Iowa City. He is a member of the Academy of Sciences at Göttingen, the New York Academy of Sciences, the German Academy of Sciences Leopoldina in Halle, the Russian Academy of Sciences, Associé étranger de l’Académie des Sciences, and the Academia Europæa in London.

He served as the Vice President of the German Chemical Society during 1995, and presently he is the President of the Academy of Sciences of Göttingen.

More than 1000 peer-reviewed papers, articles, patents, and books record his research activity in the areas of inorganic chemistry and Material sciences. He is also the recipient of several prizes, i.e. the prestigious Gottfried Wilhelm Leibniz Prize, the Alfred Stock Memorial Prize, the Grand Prix de la Foundation de la Maison de la Chimie, the Wilkinson Prize and ACS awards in Inorganic and Fluorine Chemistry.

External links
 Homepage at University of Göttingen

1935 births
Living people
Gottfried Wilhelm Leibniz Prize winners
Members of Academia Europaea
Members of the European Academy of Sciences and Arts
Foreign Members of the Russian Academy of Sciences
Members of the Austrian Academy of Sciences
Members of the French Academy of Sciences